Chrysalis is a private, small therapeutic boarding school for girls between the ages of 13 and 18 years old. It is located in Eureka, Montana. Chrysalis was created in 1998 and now is a full member of the National Association of Therapeutic Schools and Programs (NATSAP).

The Chrysalis program is largely based on peer accountability, outdoor adventure therapy, and group therapy sessions they call "circles." The self-reported length of the program is between 18 and 24 months.

See also 
 Wilderness therapy

References

External links 
 
 A Place of Growth - An article published on September 20, 2009, by the Daily Inter Lake, which details the swift financial success of the school as well as the profile of some of the students
-An article by The Woodbury Report, by Loi Eberle; September, 2001.
 Chrysalis' Blog

Further reading 
 Maia Szalavitz (2006), Help at Any Cost, Riverhead. . A former senior fellow of the Statistical Assessment Service at George Mason University offers a thoroughly researched critique of the troubled-teen industry, which includes an ethical guide for parents with troubled teenagers.

Outdoor education organizations
Boarding schools in Montana
Private high schools in Montana
Therapeutic boarding schools in the United States